Sydney Woodrow Parfrey (October 5, 1922 – July 29, 1984) was an American film and television actor from the 1950s to the early 1980s. He is often remembered as "one of TV's great slimeball villains".

Early life 
Parfrey was born on October 5, 1922, in New York City. He was orphaned as a teenager. He attended The New School, and worked as an automobile mechanic before going into the military.

Military service
Parfrey fought at the Battle of the Bulge during World War II and was wounded and captured by the Germans. When he was released from the Army, testing indicated that he should become an actor, which led to his new profession.

Career 

Parfrey acted almost entirely on Broadway or regional stage in the late 1940s and 1950s, turning to television and film substantially in the 1960s. He played the unbalanced informer Herbert Gelman on Broadway in the original production of Advise and Consent (1961), for which he won the Fanny Kemble Award.

Though usually a supporting player, he played many focal television guest-star roles, mainly in the late 1960s when fantasy and spy shows relied heavily on distinctive guest players. He appeared five times on The Man From U.N.C.L.E., more than any other guest star except Jill Ireland, who also appeared five times. In 1962 Parfrey appeared as Joe Darby on the TV western The Virginian in the episode titled "The Accomplice". In 1962 he played the part of the murderer George Pickson in Perry Mason, "The Case of the Bogus Books".  In 1963,  he played the part of George Moffgat  in Perry Mason, "The Case of the Drowsy Mosquito". In 1967 he appeared as Brock in the fourth season of the science fiction TV show Voyage to the Bottom of the Sea in the episode "Fatal Cargo". He later appeared as storekeeper Ike Godsey in The Homecoming: A Christmas Story (1971), the TV movie pilot for The Waltons (1971); The Moneychangers (1976); Backstairs at the White House (1979); and, in his only regular role, the short-lived 1979 CBS series Time Express.

Parfrey scored a few big A-movie parts, most notably as a prisoner in Papillon (1973). Parfrey's frequent association with that film's director, Franklin Schaffner, also included his role as Maximus, one of the three "See No Evil" orangutan judges in Planet of the Apes (1968). Later he would appear as a chimpanzee prefect on the television series based on the film franchise.

Parfrey also appeared routinely in films directed by Don Siegel and Clint Eastwood, including noted roles in Siegel's Charley Varrick (1973) and Eastwood's The Outlaw Josey Wales (1976).

His many film credits also include parts in Cattle King (1963), The War Lord (1965), The King's Pirate (1967), How to Save a Marriage and Ruin Your Life (1968), Madigan (1968), Sam Whiskey (1969), Cold Turkey (1971), Dirty Harry (1971), Oklahoma Crude (1973), Stay Hungry (1976), The Incredible Journey of Doctor Meg Laurel (1979), Carny (1980),  Bronco Billy (1980), Used Cars (1980), The Seduction (1982), Frances (1982) and Jinxed (1982).

Personal life
On February 18, 1950, Parfrey married Rosa Ellovich and trained under acting teacher Erwin Piscator at the New School for Social Research.

Death
Parfrey died of a heart attack on July 29, 1984, aged 61 years, in Los Angeles. He is buried in Los Angeles National Cemetery.

His son was "underground" publisher Adam Parfrey, who died at the same age as his father.

Selected filmography 

So Lovely... So Deadly (1957) - Bill Emerson
Johnny Gunman (1957) - Sidney Wells
Perry Mason (1963) - George Moffgat
Cattle King (1963) - Stafford
The War Lord (1965) - Piet
The Munsters (1965) - Mr. Petrie
Hogan's Heroes (1965) - Dr. Schneider
The Flying Nun (1966) - Weatherman
The King's Pirate (1967) - Gow
Lost in Space (1967) - Colonel Fogey
The Flim-Flam Man (1967) - Supermarket manager
Hogan's Heroes (1967) - Hugo Hindmann
How to Save a Marriage and Ruin Your Life (1968) - Eddie Rankin
Planet of the Apes (1968) - Maximus
Madigan (1968) - Marvin
I Dream of Jeannie (1969) - Mr. Farber
Sam Whiskey (1969) - Thorston Bromley
Cold Turkey (1971) - Tobacco executive
Dirty Harry (1971) - Mr. Jaffe
Oklahoma Crude (1973) - Lawyer
Charley Varrick (1973) - Harold Young
Papillon (1973) - Clusiot
Hearts of the West (1975) - Mr. Gates - Producer (uncredited)
Stay Hungry (1976) - Uncle Albert
The Outlaw Josey Wales (1976) - Carpetbagger
The Seniors (1978) - 1st Attorney
The Incredible Journey of Doctor Meg Laurel (1979) - Messerschmidt
Carny (1980) - W. C. Hannon
Bronco Billy (1980) - Dr. Canterbury
Used Cars (1980) - Mr. Ghertner
The Seduction (1982) - Store Salesman
Jinxed (1982) - Insurance Agent
Frances (1982) - Dr. Doyle
The Sting II (1983) - Georgie
Remington Steele (1984) - Archie Doke

References

External links 
 
 
 
In Loving Memory Of Woodrow Parfey

1922 births
1984 deaths
American male film actors
American male television actors
Male actors from New York City
Military personnel from New York City
The New School alumni
United States Army personnel of World War II
20th-century American male actors
Burials at Los Angeles National Cemetery
American prisoners of war in World War II
World War II prisoners of war held by Germany